Ko Hung may represent the romanization of:
 Ge Hong (283–343), Chinese Taoist philosopher and alchemist of the fourth century
 Go Heung, historian of the ancient Korean kingdom of Baekje